Below are the results of the FIS Alpine World Ski Championships 2007 downhill women's race which took place on 11 February 2007.

Results

References 

Women's Downhill
2007 in Swedish women's sport